Myrcia crebra is a species of plant in the family Myrtaceae. It is found from in South America from Venezuela to northern Peru and eastern Bolivia and Brazil.

References

crebra
Taxonomy articles created by Polbot